Tobi (Tōbi), also known as Tybi (Tybí) and Tubah, is the fifth month of the ancient Egyptian and Coptic calendars. It lies between January 9 and February 7 of the Gregorian calendar. The month of Tobi is also the first month of the season of Proyet (Growth and Emergence) in Ancient Egypt, where the Nile floods recede and the crops start to grow throughout the land of Egypt.

Name
The name of the month of Tobi comes from Amso Khem, a form of the Ancient Egyptian God Amun Ra.

Description
Toubeh, (the ancient Tobi) : the 5th Coptic month. Corn and flax should be cleared from weeds, and land that is to be devoted to cotton, sesame, and summer cucurbita, is prepared until the 1st of Amshir. Land destined for the growth of culcas (colocasia), and sugar, should be inundated. Lands found to be uncultivable should be marked out and declared unproductive, in order that they may be exempt from taxation. The first cutting of sugar cane takes place (hasab er-rcis) -. sufficient being left for seed, viz : — one kirat in every feddan. At the end of the month work in canals and dykes should be taken in hand : and much care should be bestowed upon the repairing of sakhiehs ( water wheels), wells, &c. The Nile water is in its clearest and best state in Toubeh, and cisterns should be now filled in Cairo and all large towns. The flesh of sheep is better now than at any other season. Vegetables, especially carrots, are at their best. Horses and mules should be tethered in bersim, and it is now time for the sale of cattle. S. winds (Siba) are more prevalent than N. (Dabour). Taxes are now collected. There are various popular sayings respecting Toubeh, — e. g. that if rain falls on any of the first eleven days, but especially on the Festival of the Epiphany, it is a certain sign of good crops. The fellah says " Yfra en Nusrani" (the Christian is happy ) and asserts that God is contented with his people, and will reward them with a bounteous harvest.

Coptic Synaxarium of the month of Tobi

See also
 Islamic calendar

References

Citations

Bibliography
    Synaxarium of the month of Touba

Months of the Coptic calendar
Egyptian calendar